Olav Dalgard (June 19, 1898 – December 25, 1980) was a Norwegian literary and art historian, filmmaker, author and educator.

Biography 
Dalgard was born Olaf Hanssen in Folldal, in Hedmark, Norway. From the age of three, he was raised at Oppdal in Trøndelag. He earned an M.A. degree in literature and art history at the University of Oslo in 1929. He was an advocate of the use of Nynorsk and served as the chairman of the student Nynorsk association. He was also involved in the Mot Dag movement.

Dalgard worked as a literary critic for the newspapers Dagbladet and Arbeiderbladet. Dalgard took over as dramatic advisor and instructor for Det Norske Teateret in 1931 and was involved with the theater for 48 years.

He studied film in the Soviet Union and in the 1930s produced several films with a socialist message. Dalgard was also active in the Norwegian Labour Party's cultural operations.
During the Occupation of Norway by Nazi Germany, Dalgard was arrested in 1942, held as a political prisoner by German authorities and sent to the Sachsenhausen concentration camp.

Dalgard was involved in the establishment of the Norwegian Film Institute and was a member of the state film board. Among his most famous works was Gryr i Norden (1939).  Dalgard both wrote the script and directed the film which was a dramatization of the Kristiania Match Workers' Strike of 1889.  He also wrote a number of books about theater and film as well as biographies including  (nonfiction, 1948),  (nonfiction, 1951),  (nonfiction, 1955), Lars Tvinde (biography of Lars Tvinde, 1966) and Inge Krokann (biography of Inge Krokann, 1970).

Dalgard was chairman of the Norwegian Literature Critics' Association from 1953 to 1955, and president of the Norwegian Humanist Association from 1965 to 1977. From 1961, Dalgard received a government grant. He was a lecturer in theater history at the Norwegian National Academy of Theatre and at the Department of Theater Science at the University of Oslo.

Personal life
In 1926, he married Anna Marie Sorteberg (1897–1968). They resided at Voll in Akershus. Psychiatrist  was their son. 

In 1978 he accepted the Arts Council Norway Honorary Award and in 1979 he received the Literary Collection Literature Prize. 

Dalgard died in Bærum in 1980.

It is given annually to a reviewer in literature, film, or theater by the Norwegian Critics' Association.

Works

Books 

  (1930) 
  (1933) 
  (1934) 
  (1936) 
  (1945) 
  (1951) 
 Lars Tvinde (1966) 

 Inge Krokann (1970) 

 (1972) 
  (1973)   
  (1974) 
 (1976)  
  (1978)  
  (1979)

Films 

  (1935)
 Vi bygger landet (1936)
 By og land hand i hand (1937)
 Det drønner gjennom dalen (1938)
 Lenkene brytes (1938)
 Gryr i Norden (1939)
 Om kjærlighet synger de (1946)
 Vi vil leve (1946)

References

External links

1898 births
1980 deaths
People from Folldal
People from Oppdal
University of Oslo alumni
Norwegian literary critics
Norwegian writers
Norwegian film directors
Nynorsk-language writers
Norwegian humanists
Academic staff of the Oslo National Academy of the Arts
Academic staff of the University of Oslo
Mot Dag
Sachsenhausen concentration camp survivors